is a Japanese anime television series by Akatsuki based on the in-game band of the same name from Sega's Chunithm action-rhythm game. It aired from January to February 2022.

Characters

Production and release
In November 2021, it was announced that Frontwing would be producing a short anime series for Irodorimidori, one of the in-game bands from Chunithm. The series' animation was produced by Akatsuki with direction from Chihaya Tanaka, while Tanaka and Rei Ishikura wrote the scripts. D.watt composed the music. It aired for 8 episodes from January 5 to February 23, 2022 on Tokyo MX and AT-X.

Episode list

References

External links
  
 

2022 anime television series debuts
Animated musical groups
Anime television series based on video games
Music in anime and manga
Tokyo MX original programming